The US Universities Debating Championship (USUDC) is the largest British Parliamentary debating tournament in the United States, and one of the largest debate tournaments in the world. The event is held for college and university students attending school in the United States, and is hosted by a different university each year. The host is selected by the member schools of the US Universities Debate Association. The event determines the National Champions for the year.

Most recently the tournament was hosted by Hobart and William Smith Colleges in November 2022. The current National Champions are Arthur Lee and Tejas Subramaniam from Stanford University. The Novice (first year) division was won by Jake Peralta and Helen Chau from the University of Pennsylvania. Greg Weaving from Princeton University and Tejas Subramaniam from Stanford University were joint top individual speakers at the tournament; 	
Bowser Liu from the University of Chicago was top novice speaker.

Format

USUDC is held in a format based on the World Universities Debating Championship. The tournament is held in April, before most American colleges hold their final exams. In recent years about 180 teams have competed at the tournament. Since 2015, only students registered at an American college or university may compete in playoff rounds and be made National Champion, but students from foreign schools can still compete. Before 2015, foreign schools were allowed to compete in playoffs, resulting in a 2012 championship where separate tournament champions and national champions were crowned.

Each team consists of two students from the same college or university. In a given debate they will compete against three other teams simultaneously. A motion, or proposition, is given to the teams fifteen minutes before the debate. Two teams are assigned to defend the motion while the other two teams are to oppose it. The teams are judged by a panel of judges, who rank them from first place to fourth place based on respective contributions and assign scores to each person based on the quality of their speech. In a debate, teams typically go against teams with a similar record as themselves, based on a scoring system where first place in a previous round is worth three points, second worth two, third worth one, and fourth worth none. If a team had six points after three rounds, then they would expect to compete against other teams with six points.

After six or eight preliminary rounds there is a "break," announced at the banquet on the second day, where the top thirty-two teams progress to the third day. On day three, rounds are elimination rounds, where the bottom two teams in a round do not progress. Rounds progress through octofinals, then quarterfinals, semifinals, and finals, where the National Champion is named. Seeding for octofinals is based on the cumulative points the team had at the end of preliminary rounds.

Novices, teams consisting of students in their first year of collegiate debate, have a separate break to novice quarterfinals or semifinals should they not make the open octofinals. A subsequent novice final then crowns the Novice Champion.

US Universities Debate Association

The US Universities Debate Association (USUDA) is the body which governs USUDC. It was founded in 2013 in order to organize the British Parliamentary debate circuit in the United States. They select the host for the next USUDC each year. Membership in the USUDA is open to all colleges and universities in the United States.

Tournaments by Year

Harvard has won the Championship five times, Yale twice, and no other school more than once. In 2018, Harvard became the first school to successfully defend the title.

See also

 World Universities Debating Championship
 European Universities Debating Championship
 North American Debating Championship

Notes

References

North American debating competitions